Osmania may refer to:

Osmania alphabet or Osmanya script, script created in the 1920s for Somali
Osmania College, public provincial school in Jaffna, Sri Lanka
Osmania University, public state university in Hyderabad, India named after the last nizam of Hyderabad, Mir Osman Ali Khan
Osmania University College for Women
Osmania University Common Entrance Test
Osmania University's College of Technology
Osmania Medical College, medical college in Hyderabad, India
Osmania General Hospital, hospital in Hyderabad, India
Osmanian caliphate or Ottoman Caliphate, Islamic domain under the Ottoman dynasty (1517–1924)
Osmanian Empire or Ottoman Empire, empire existing from c. 1299 to 1922

See also
 Osman (disambiguation)